Nadeem Ehsan is a Pakistani politician who has been a member of the National Assembly of Pakistan from February 2008 to December 2012 and the Minister of State for Overseas Pakistani from May 2011 to December 2012.

Political career
He flee Pakistan during Operation Clean-up and returned to Pakistan in 2008.

He was elected to the National Assembly of Pakistan as a candidate of Muttahida Qaumi Movement from Constituency NA-247 (Karachi-IX) in 2008 Pakistani general election.

In May 2011, he was inducted into the federal cabinet of Prime Minister Yousaf Raza Gillani and was made Minister of State for Overseas Pakistani. In June 2012, he inducted into the federal cabinet of Prime Minister Raja Pervaiz Ashraf and was re-appointed as Minister of State for Overseas Pakistani.

He resigned from his National Assembly seat in December 2012 due to having dual nationality.

References

Pakistani MNAs 2008–2013
Living people
Muttahida Qaumi Movement MNAs
Year of birth missing (living people)